John Paul Lizardo (born June 8, 1986), also known as Japoy Lizardo, is a Filipino taekwondo practitioner, actor and commercial model.

Education
Lizardo attended Pasig Catholic College and studied college at De La Salle University - College of Saint Benilde.

Career
At 11 years old, Lizardo took up taekwondo, the year later he earned black belt. He joined the Philippine Black Belt contingent, the national team for students pursuing their elementary and high school studies, at age 12. When he was two years older, he joined the Philippine junior national team and began to compete in international tournaments such as the Korean Open and the Asian Junior Championship. By age 18, Lizardo was already a member of the senior national team.

Lizardo first garnered attention at the 2001 Asian Junior Taekwondo Championships where he captured the silver medal in the men's finweight.

He has won three medals (two silvers  one bronze) at the senior stage of the Asian Taekwondo Championships and competed in the World Taekwondo Championships in 2007 and 2009.

He ended his competitive career when he quit as a member of the Philippine men's taekwondo team in November 2015 due to his leg injury.

Lizardo was among the 14 scholar-athletes who have scholarships from the Olympic Solidarity Movement under the Philippine Olympic Committee.

By 2016, Lizardo now serves as head coach of the Philippine national taekwondo team.

Personal life
He is married with co-taekwondo artist Janice Lagman since May 8, 2016. On August 11, 2016, the couple announced on Instagram that they are expecting their first child. They announced the birth of their first child on February 25, 2017.

References

External links
 Interview on Japoy Lizardo from World Taekwondo Federation (official website)

Living people
1986 births
Star Magic
Filipino male taekwondo practitioners
Filipino male television actors
Asian Games medalists in taekwondo
Taekwondo practitioners at the 2006 Asian Games
Taekwondo practitioners at the 2010 Asian Games
Taekwondo practitioners at the 2014 Asian Games
Asian Games bronze medalists for the Philippines
Medalists at the 2010 Asian Games
Southeast Asian Games gold medalists for the Philippines
Southeast Asian Games silver medalists for the Philippines
Southeast Asian Games medalists in taekwondo
Competitors at the 2005 Southeast Asian Games
Competitors at the 2009 Southeast Asian Games
Competitors at the 2011 Southeast Asian Games
Asian Taekwondo Championships medalists